Heinrich Schiebel (born 24 November 1926) is an Austrian former cyclist. He competed in the team pursuit event at the 1948 Summer Olympics.

References

External links
 

1926 births
Possibly living people
Austrian male cyclists
Olympic cyclists of Austria
Cyclists at the 1948 Summer Olympics
Place of birth missing (living people)